Perkrishnopur Madna Union is a union parishad of Damurhuda Upazila, in Chuadanga District, Khulna Division of Bangladesh. There are 14 villages and 12 mouzas in the union.

References

External links
 

Unions of Khulna Division
Unions of Chuadanga District
Unions of Damurhuda Upazila